3rd (UK) Division Signal Regiment is a regiment of the Royal Corps of Signals within the British Army.  The regiment is based at Bulford.

History 
The regiment can trace its history back to "The Telegraph Battalion, Royal Engineers".  In 1903, it was designated as the 'telegraph battalion' for 3rd Division. In 1945, the regiment was re-titled as the "3rd Infantry Division Signal Regiment".  

In 1947 upon returning from British Palestine the regiment disbanded, but re-formed in 1951 as part of the new Army Strategic Command and later deployed during the Suez Crisis in 1956.  After further re-organisation, the regiment had three squadrons under its command, namely, 202 squadron, 206 squadron and 222 squadron.  

In early 1993, as a result of Options for Change, the regiment moved to Bulford where it was re-titled as "3rd (UK) Division Headquarters and Signal Regiment". As part of the Army 2020 reforms, the regiment has fallen under the command of the 7 Signal group, 11th Signal Brigade.

Current Organisation 
The current organisation of the regiment is:

 Regimental Headquarters, at Kiwi Barracks, Bulford Garrison
 202 Signal Squadron (High Readiness, 5 days notice)
 228 Signal Squadron (Armoured HQ support)
 249 (Gurkha) Signal Squadron (HQ support)
 Support (The Somme) Squadron

Alliances and affiliations 
 - Oxford University Officer Training Corps

 - Southampton University Officer Training Corps

References

External links 
3RD (UK) Division Signal Regiment

Regiments of the Royal Corps of Signals